Bettina Schausten (born 18 February 1965, in Lüdinghausen) is a German journalist.

Early life and education 
Schausten studied literature, history and Catholic theology in Cologne and in Munich  from 1986 to 1992.

Career 
From 1992 to 1996 Schausten worked for German broadcaster SWF as a television reporter.

In 1996, Schausten moved to German broadcaster ZDF and soon worked as chief of staff to editor-in-chief Klaus Bresser. She later presented of the channel's morning show, from 1999 to 2002 and Politbarometer from 2003 to 2010. From 2010 until 2019, she led the ZDF bureau in Berlin; she was the first woman in that position.

Since March 2019 Schausten has been serving as deputy editor-in-chief of ZDF, alongside editor-in-chief Peter Frey. In addition, she has occasionally been the anchor of ZDF's daily news show heute-journal since July 2020, filling in for Claus Kleber, Marietta Slomka and Christian Sievers.

During her time at ZDF, Schausten notably was one of the few TV journalists who conducted interviews with Chancellor Angela Merkel almost annually: in 2010, 2012, 2013, 2014, 2015, 2016, 2017, 2018 and 2020. In 2013, she produced a documentary on Merkel.

Awards 
 2009: Deutscher Fernsehpreis

Personal life 
Schausten has been married to German ZDF journalist Thomas Fuhrmann since 2008.

References 

1965 births
Living people
German broadcast news analysts
German television journalists
German women television presenters
German television presenters
German women television journalists
21st-century German journalists
ZDF people
21st-century German women